Bellevue Avenue Colored School is located in Trenton, Mercer County, New Jersey, United States. The building was built in 1883 and added to the National Register of Historic Places in 1997.

It is a two-story brick Italianate building, built as a "new school building for the use of the colored
children of Trenton".

It has also been known as Lincoln School, Old Lincoln School, Public School No. 14, and as King David Lodge No. 15 F & AM. It was owned by the Aracia Temple Building Corporation (King David Lodge No. 15) in 1996.

See also
National Register of Historic Places listings in Mercer County, New Jersey

References

Masonic buildings in New Jersey
Masonic buildings completed in 1883
School buildings on the National Register of Historic Places in New Jersey
Buildings and structures in Trenton, New Jersey
Defunct schools in New Jersey
National Register of Historic Places in Trenton, New Jersey
New Jersey Register of Historic Places